Viniferin may refer to:
 alpha-Viniferin, a resveratrol trimer
 beta-Viniferin, a resveratrol cyclic tetramer
 delta-Viniferin, a resveratrol dehydrodimer
 epsilon-Viniferin, a resveratrol dimer
 gamma-Viniferin, a more highly polymerised oligomer of resveratrol
 R-Viniferin, a synonym for the stilbenoid vitisin B
 R2-Viniferin, a synonym for the stilbenoid vitisin A